Naevius may refer to:

 Gnaeus Naevius, Roman poet and dramatist
 Naevius (spider), a genus of spiders
 Naevius Sutorius Macro, confidant of Roman emperors Tiberius and Caligula

See also 

 
 Naevia gens
 The Porta Naevia was a gate in the Servian Wall on the Aventine Hill of Rome